The 2023 Colorado Rapids season is the club's twenty-eighth season of existence and their twenty-eighth consecutive season in Major League Soccer (MLS), the top flight of American soccer.

Background

Colorado finished the 2022 season 10th in the Western Conference table, and 18th overall in MLS. They did not qualify for the 2022 MLS Cup Playoffs. Additionally, they were knocked out of the 2022 CONCACAF Champions League in the round of 16 by Guatemalan side Comunicaciones F.C., and were eliminated from the 2022 U.S. Open Cup in the round of 32 by Minnesota United FC. They lost the Rocky Mountain Cup to Real Salt Lake.

Roster

Competitions

Preseason

Major League Soccer

Standings

Western Conference

Overall table

Match results

Leagues Cup

Central 4

U.S. Open Cup

Statistics

Appearances and goals
Numbers after plus–sign (+) denote appearances as a substitute.

Top scorers
{| class="wikitable" style="font-size: 95%; text-align: center;"
|-
!width=30|Rank
!width=30|Position
!width=30|Number
!width=175|Name
!width=75|
!width=75|
!width=75|
!width=75|Total
|-
!colspan="4"|Total !! 0 !! 0 !! 0 !! 0
|-

Top assists
{| class="wikitable" style="font-size: 95%; text-align: center;"
|-
!width=30|Rank
!width=30|Position
!width=30|Number
!width=175|Name
!width=75|
!width=75|
!width=75|
!width=75|Total
|-
!colspan="4"|Total !! 0 !! 0 !! 0 !! 0
|-

Clean sheets
{| class="wikitable" style="font-size: 95%; text-align: center;"
|-
!width=30|Rank
!width=30|Position
!width=30|Number
!width=175|Name
!width=75|
!width=75|
!width=75|
!width=75|Total
|-
|colspan=1| 1
|GK
| 22 ||  William Yarbrough
| 1 || 0 || 0 || 1
|-
!colspan="4"|Total !! 1 !! 0 !! 0 !! 1

Disciplinary record
{| class="wikitable" style="text-align:center;"
|-
| rowspan="2" !width=15|Rank
| rowspan="2" !width=15|
| rowspan="2" !width=15|
| rowspan="2" !width=120|Player
| colspan="3"|MLS
| colspan="3"|US Open Cup
| colspan="3"|Leagues Cup
| colspan="3"|Total
|-
!width=34; background:#fe9;|
!width=34; background:#fe9;|
!width=34; background:#ff8888;|
!width=34; background:#fe9;|
!width=34; background:#fe9;|
!width=34; background:#ff8888;|
!width=34; background:#fe9;|
!width=34; background:#fe9;|
!width=34; background:#ff8888;|
!width=34; background:#fe9;|
!width=34; background:#fe9;|
!width=34; background:#ff8888;|
|-
|rowspan=1| 1
| 91 || FW ||  Kévin Cabral
| 2 || 0 || 0 || 0 || 0 || 0 || 0 || 0 || 0 || 2 || 0 || 0
|-
|rowspan=3| 2
| 6 || DF ||  Lalas Abubakar
| 1 || 0 || 0 || 0 || 0 || 0 || 0 || 0 || 0 || 1 || 0 || 0
|-
| 19 || MF ||  Jack Price
| 1 || 0 || 0 || 0 || 0 || 0 || 0 || 0 || 0 || 1 || 0 || 0
|-
| 21 || MF ||  Bryan Acosta
| 1 || 0 || 0 || 0 || 0 || 0 || 0 || 0 || 0 || 1 || 0 || 0
|-
!colspan="4"|Total !! 5 !! 0 !! 0 !! 0 !! 0 !! 0 !! 0 !! 0 !! 0 !! 5 !! 0 !! 0

Transfers

For transfers in, dates listed are when the Rapids officially signed the players to the roster. For transfers out, dates are listed when the Rapids officially removed the players from the roster, not when they signed with another club. If a player later signed with a different club, his new club will be noted, but the date listed remains when he was officially removed from the roster.

In

Loans in

SuperDraft

Draft picks are not automatically signed to the team roster. Only those who are signed to a contract will be listed as transfers in. Only trades involving draft picks and executed after the start of the 2023 MLS SuperDraft will be listed in the notes.

Out

See also
 Colorado Rapids
 2023 in American soccer
 2023 Major League Soccer season

References

Colorado Rapids seasons
Colorado Rapids
Colorado Rapids
Colorado Rapids